This is a timeline documenting the events of heavy metal in the year 2011.

Bands disbanded
 Ark
 Dawn of Retribution
 Devian
 Dismember
 Elexorien
 The Famine
 Five Star Prison Cell
 God Dethroned
 Haste the Day
 Hell Within
 Jag Panzer
 Lifelover
 Ludicra
 Machine Men
 Metalium
 Oceans of Sadness
 Symphorce

Bands reformed
 At the Gates
 Black Sabbath
 Coal Chamber
 I Killed the Prom Queen
 Ministry
 Morgion
 Nocte Obducta
 Still Remains
 System of a Down

Events
 Coroner played one of their first reunion shows at this year's edition of Hellfest, which took place June 17–19, 2011 in Clisson, France.
 Judas Priest embarked on Epitaph World Tour. Despite this, the band insist that they are not going to break up. However, founding member K. K. Downing later retires from the band. Judas Priest also stated "Having thought long and hard about how to proceed, Rob, Glenn, Ian and Scott unanimously agreed that they should go ahead with the tour and not let the fans down around the world". Thirty-one-year-old British guitar player Richie Faulkner was announced as the replacement, but the press release did not state if it is on a permanent basis.
 Morgoth embarkinged on a festival tour to celebrate the 20th anniversary of their 1991 album, Cursed.
 Slipknot toured again. This was their first tour without bassist Paul Gray, who died in May 2010.
 Acid Reign released their remasters of Moshkinstein, The Fear and Obnoxious on January 17, 2011 on CD and digital download. All remastered by the Bill Metoyer.
 Former Dream Theater drummer Mike Portnoy formed an as-yet-unnamed project with Steve Morse (Dixie Dregs, Kansas, Deep Purple), Neal Morse (Spock's Beard), Casey McPherson (Alpha Rev, Endochine) and Dave LaRue (Steve Morse, Dixie Dregs). Portnoy is also touring with a Beatles cover band called Yellow Matter Custard.
 Warbringer's drummer and founding member Nic Ritter leaves the band.
 Bury Your Dead announces the departure of Myke Terry and return of Mat Bruso.
 On January 8, 2011 22-year-old Jared Lee Loughner was arrested for shooting and killing six bystanders in Tucson, Arizona, and injuring 14 others. The Washington Post noted that Loughner's YouTube channel had only one clip; a fan-made music video for the controversial Drowning Pool song titled "Bodies." Other members of the media also suggested that his music tastes affected his behavior, including political commentator Rush Limbaugh who was quoted saying, "The guy listened to heavy metal, and some of that anarchist stuff. We're dealing with an insane individual." Drowning Pool responded to these allegations by claiming that the song was written about the camaraderie seen in mosh pits, and is in no way a violent song.
 The original long-running guitarist for Dutch metal band Vengeance died due to a heart attack at his home in Mierlo, The Netherlands.
 Doom metal band Cathedral have announced they will disband after releasing another album in 2012.
 Slayer guitarist Jeff Hanneman contracted necrotizing fasciitis, and underwent emergency surgery on his right arm.  On Saturday April 23, Jeff Hanneman made a surprise stage return in Indio, CA.  He came out during the 2 song encore unannounced, and delighted a crowd of roughly 50,000.  Jeff commented afterwards that, "I'm the happiest man in the world."
 Iron Maiden wins their first Grammy award in the category of Best Metal Performance for the song "El Dorado" from their latest album The Final Frontier.
 Nevermore bassist Jim Sheppard went under a brain surgery to remove a "benign brain tumor".
 Blinded Colony changed their band name once again (previously Stigmata) to The Blinded.
 After searching for over a year, DragonForce founded 23-year-old Marc Hudson as their new vocalist.
 Vocalist Matt Barlow leaves Iced Earth again for personal reasons.
 Vocalist Anette Olzon of Nightwish broke a couple ribs from slipping on her son's toys.
 Niclas Engelin, officially rejoins In Flames.
 The Red Chord once again parts ways with their drummer Michael Justian.
 Corey Taylor has announced that Slipknot would not be recording for a while due to bassist Paul Gray's death.  He said to Undercover.com.au, "I don't see it happening. And if it does, it'll be way way down the line.  There is a such a huge piece missing now. A piece so huge that the fans can't even understand." Slipknot have also announced their bass guitar touring replacement is their original guitarist Donnie Steele.
 Paul Di'Anno (ex -Iron Maiden) was charged with 8 counts of benefits fraud of £45,000 (€53,000, $72,000).  He claimed to have nerve damage in his back and the Department for Work and Pensions got a tip from an anonymous tipper who said he was jumping around on stage.  The Department for Work and Pensions gave him four and a half months in jail and took his property.  He was released from jail in March 2011.
 Origin recruited Jason Keyser (Skinless) as their new vocalist.
 Manowar caused a blackout in Cleveland, Ohio while performing a sound-check on March 11.  A whole city block lost electricity and was not back in service for another 24 hours. Manowar had backup generators so the show was able to continue.
 Keyboardist Per Wiberg parted ways with Opeth as "part of a mutual decision with the band", after finishing recording.  A new keyboardist has already been found, but is waiting to be announced.
 Iced Earth announced their replacement for Matt Barlow as Stu Block (Into Eternity).
 Aspera were forced to change their band name to Above Symmetry due to a lawsuit over right to the name by American indie rock band Aspera.
 Legion of the Damned guitarist Richard Ebisch left the band due to health issues.
 Shining announced the departure of guitarist Fredric Gråby, and his replacement as temporary bassist Christian Larsson who is also now announced as a full-time member.
 Nevermore announced the departure of original members Jeff Loomis and Van Williams.
 After some speculation, Kamelot vocalist Roy Khan announced his departure from the band.
 Sinister parted ways with drummer Edwin van den Eeden, guitarist Alex Paul, and bassist Joost van der Graaf.  Three days later Sinister announces Toep Duin on drums, guitarist Bastiaan Brussaard, and bassist/guitarist Dennis Hartog.
 ICS Vortex returned to Borknagar as a second vocalist.
 Dream Theater announced their replacement for Mike Portnoy as Mike Mangini (ex-Steve Vai, ex-Extreme, ex-Annihilator).
 IWrestledABearOnce changed their genre to black metal as a joke.
 Jon Levasseur rejoined Cryptopsy for work on their upcoming record.
 Bison B.C. part ways with original drummer Brad McKinnon.
 X Japan released Jade, their first worldwide single.
 On June 5, New Zealand authorities confiscated Cradle of Filth's T-shirts.  The shirts depict a nude nun and the words "Jesus Is A Cunt".
 Lead vocalist Keith Caputo of alternative metal band Life of Agony changed her name to Keith Mina Caputo, and her gender from male to female.
 Mayhem bassist Necrobutcher will appeared on Norwegian television station NRK, to exorcise the demon within himself.
 Tarja Turunen announced her participation in a new musical group, entitled "Harus".
 A reporter from England's Birmingham Mail erroneously announced that Black Sabbath would reunite to write a new album based on an off-the-record statement made months prior by Tony Iommi. In his statement denouncing the reformation of the band, Iommi said he was just "shooting the breeze" with the reporter and the band is not reforming.
 Roadrunner Records has announced they have signed progressive rock outfit Rush.
 Skitzo performed at the Phoenix Theater in Petaluma, California, for their 30th anniversary on October 8.
 After 23 years of playing, Dismember decided to call it quits on October 15, 2011.
 Original vocalist of Exhorder Kyle Thomas and guitarist Jay Ceravolo quit the band.  Kyle also stated "I wish all of my brothers involved well and good luck in whatever the future brings them, whether or not Exhorder continues."
 Frontman, guitarist and founding member Helmuth Lehner (Belphegor) had "a serious and difficult operation", and therefore Belphegor ceased all activity until May 2012.
 After 13 years with the band, guitarist Johan Hallgren leaves Pain of Salvation to focus on his family-life.
 Decapitated survive an emergency plane landing in Warsaw.  They were flying back to Poland from the United States, when they needed to make an emergency landing when the landing gear failed to operate.  They have also cancelled all forthcoming festival dates.
 The two guitarists Matt DeVries and Rob Arnold of heavy metal outfit Chimaira announced their departure of the band.  They are replaced by Jeremy Creamer (Dååth) on bass guitar and Matt Szlachta (ex-Dirge Within) on rhythm guitar.
 Power Quest announced new front-man/vocalist Colin Callanan.
 Drummer Paul Bostaph left Testament, and started a collaboration with ex-Anthrax vocalist Dan Nelson.
 Darkest Hour replaced their drummer Ryan Parrish with Timothy Java (ex-Dead to Fall).
 Cannabis Corpse lost their two members; vocalist Andy "Weedgrinder" Horn and guitarist Nick "Nikropolis" Poulos.
 Blood Red Throne announced vocalist Yngve Bolt Christiansen (Goddamn) and bassist Erlend Caspersen (Horizon Ablaze) as their newest members.

Deaths
 January 7 – Phil Kennemore, bassist of Y&T, died from lung cancer at the age of 57.
 January 17 – Didier Bernoussi, former guitarist of Warning, died from undisclosed reasons at the age of 54.
 January 28 – Jan Somers, guitarist of Vengeance, died from a heart attack at the age of 46.
 February 6 – Gary Moore, former guitarist of Thin Lizzy, died from a heart attack while on holiday in Spain at the age of 58.
 February 23 – Phil Vane, former vocalist of Extreme Noise Terror, died from undisclosed reasons at the age of 46.
 March 8 – Mike Starr, former bassist of Alice in Chains, died from undisclosed reasons at the age of 44.
 March 22 – Frankie Sparcello, bassist of Exhorder, died from undisclosed reasons at the age of 40.
 April 4 – Scott Columbus, former drummer of Manowar, died from undisclosed reasons at the age of 54.
 April 20 – Matt LaPorte, former guitarist of Circle II Circle and Jon Oliva's Pain, died from undisclosed reasons at the age of 40.
 June 11 – Seth Putnam, vocalist of Anal Cunt, died from a heart attack at the age of 43.
 June 13 – Mario Comesanas, DJ for Liquid Metal and writer for Revolver, died from a sudden brain hemorrhage at the age of 30.
 July 9 – Michael Burston (a.k.a. Würzel), guitarist of Motörhead, died from ventricular fibrillation triggered by cardiomyopathy at the age of 61.
 July 17 – Taiji Sawada, former bassist of X Japan and Loudness, died from complications arising from a suicide attempt at the age of 45.
 August 3 – Andrew McDermott, former vocalist of Threshold, died from kidney failure after being in a four-day coma at the age of 45.
 August 11 – Jani Lane, former lead vocalist of Warrant, died from alcohol poisoning at the age of 47.
 September 9 – Jonas Bergqvist (a.k.a. B), guitarist and vocalist of Lifelover died of unknown causes at the age of 25.
 September 21 – John Du Cann, former guitarist, bassist and vocalist of Atomic Rooster, died from a heart attack at the age of 65.
 November 2 – Cory Smoot (a.k.a. Flattus Maximus), guitarist of GWAR, died from a coronary artery thrombosis brought about by his pre-existing coronary artery disease at the age of 34.
 December 22 – David Gold, guitarist and vocalist of Woods of Ypres, died in a car accident near Barrie, ON, Canada at the age of 31.

Films
 Nightwish is releasing a movie entitled Imaginaerum the same as their up-coming album. In a press release they described it as "a music fantasy – film based on the forthcoming Nightwish album of the same title and its 13 songs. The protagonist of the film is a songwriter with an otherworldly imagination. He is an old man who still thinks he's a young boy. While asleep he travels into his distant past where his dreams of old come back to him mixed to the young boy's world of fantasy and music.  In his dreams the old man fights to find the memories most important to him."

Albums expected

January

February

March

April

May

June

July 
War of Angels; Pop Evil; July 5, 2011

August

September

October

November

December

References

External links 
 About.com: Heavy Metal

2010s in heavy metal music
Metal